The following outline is provided as an overview of and topical guide to Jammu and Kashmir:

Jammu and Kashmir – is a region administered by India as a union territory. Until 2019, it was the name of a region administered by India as a state. Often denoted by the acronym J&K. It is located mostly in the Himalayan mountains.

General reference

Names 
 Common English name: Jammu and Kashmir
 Pronunciation: 
 Official English name(s): Jammu and Kashmir
 Adjectivals
 Jammu
 Kashmiri
 Demonyms
 Jammuite
 Kashmiris

Rankings (amongst India's states) 

 by population: 19th (2011 census)
 by area: 5th (2011 census)
 by crime rate: 16th (2016)
 by gross domestic product (GDP) (2014): 20th
by Human Development Index (HDI): 0.684 (17th) (2017)
by life expectancy at birth: 72.6 years (2010–14)
by literacy rate: 67%

Geography of Jammu and Kashmir 

Geography of Jammu and Kashmir
 Jammu and Kashmir is: a region administered by India as a union territory
 Population of Jammu and Kashmir: 9,944,283 (2011)
 Area of Jammu and Kashmir: 42,241 km2 (16,309 sq mi)
 Atlas of Jammu and Kashmir

Location of Jammu and Kashmir 
 Jammu and Kashmir is situated in the north of India
 Time zone:  Indian Standard Time (UTC+05:30)

Regions of Jammu and Kashmir 

 Jammu
 Kashmir
 Districts of Jammu and Kashmir

Municipalities of Jammu and Kashmir 

 Cities of Jammu and Kashmir
 Capital of Jammu and Kashmir:
 Summer capital: Srinagar
 Winter capital: Jammu

Demography of Jammu and Kashmir 

Demographics of Jammu and Kashmir
 Dogras 
 Kashmiri Muslims
 Kashmiri Pandit
 Balti people
 Kashmiri diaspora

Government and politics of Jammu and Kashmir 

 Politics of Jammu and Kashmir
Form of government: Indian state government (parliamentary system of representative democracy)
Capital of Jammu and Kashmir:
 Summer capital: Srinagar
 Winter capital: Jammu
Darbar Move
Elections in Jammu and Kashmir

Union government in Jammu and Kashmir 
 Rajya Sabha members from Jammu and Kashmir

Branches of the government of Jammu and Kashmir 

 Government of Jammu and Kashmir
Kashmir Administrative Service

Executive branch of the government of Jammu and Kashmir 

 Head of state: Governor of Jammu and Kashmir
 Head of government: Chief Minister of Jammu and Kashmir

Legislative branch of the government of Jammu and Kashmir 
Jammu and Kashmir Legislature

Jammu and Kashmir Legislative Assembly
Jammu and Kashmir Legislative Council

Judicial branch of the government of Jammu and Kashmir 

 High Court of Jammu and Kashmir

Law and order in Jammu and Kashmir 

 Constitution of Jammu and Kashmir
 Human rights in Jammu and Kashmir
 Law enforcement in Jammu and Kashmir
Jammu and Kashmir Police
Crowd control in Jammu and Kashmir
Jammu and Kashmir State Vigilance Commission
Public Safety Act, 1978

History of Jammu and Kashmir 

 History of Kashmir

History of Jammu and Kashmir, by period

Prehistoric Jammu and Kashmir

Ancient Jammu and Kashmir 

 Kashyapa
 Dynasties of ancient Kashmir
 Kambojas
 Karkoṭa Empire
 Lalitaditya Muktapida
 Didda
 Durrani Empire

Medieval Jammu and Kashmir 

 Rajatarangini
 Zain-ul-Abidin
 Shah Mir Dynasty
 Chak dynasty

Colonial Jammu and Kashmir 

 Dogra Empire
Gulab Singh
All India Kashmir Committee
 Sikh Empire
 First Anglo-Sikh War
 Jammu and Kashmir (princely state)

Contemporary Jammu and Kashmir 

 Kashmir conflict
Timeline of the Kashmir conflict
Indo-Pakistani wars and conflicts
Insurgency in Jammu and Kashmir
Peacebuilding in Jammu and Kashmir
Human rights in Jammu and Kashmir
Women's rights in Jammu and Kashmir
Media in Jammu and Kashmir
Article 370
Jammu and Kashmir Reorganisation Bill, 2019

History of Jammu and Kashmir, by region 
 History of Kashmir
 History of Jammu
 History of Poonch District
 History of Ladakh

Culture of Jammu and Kashmir 

Culture of Kashmir

 Cuisine of Jammu and Kashmir
 Wazwan
 Kashmiri literature
 Clothing in Kashmir
 Phiran
 Cashmere wool
 Jammu dress
 Kanger
 Music of Kashmir, Jammu and Ladakh
 Kashmiriyat
 Kashmiri Pandit Festivals
Jammu and Kashmir Academy of Art, Culture and Languages
 Monuments in Jammu and Kashmir
Monuments of National Importance in Jammu and Kashmir
State Protected Monuments in Jammu and Kashmir
Architecture of Jammu and Kashmir

Art in Jammu and Kashmir 

 Music of Jammu and Kashmir

People of Jammu and Kashmir 

 People from Jammu and Kashmir
 List of Kashmiri Pandits

Religion in Jammu and Kashmir 

Religion in Jammu and Kashmir
 Hinduism in Jammu and many parts of Chenab Valley
 Islam in Kashmir
 Buddhism in Kashmir
 Kashmir Shaivism

 Amarnath

Sports in Jammu and Kashmir 

Sports in Jammu and Kashmir
 Cricket in Jammu and Kashmir
 Jammu and Kashmir Cricket Association
 Jammu and Kashmir cricket team
 Football in Jammu and Kashmir
 Jammu and Kashmir Football Association
 Jammu and Kashmir football team

Symbols of Jammu and Kashmir 

Symbols of Jammu and Kashmir

Economy and infrastructure of Jammu and Kashmir 

Economy of Jammu and Kashmir
 Tourism in Jammu and Kashmir

Education in Jammu and Kashmir 

Education in Jammu and Kashmir
 Institutions of higher education in Jammu and Kashmir
Jammu and Kashmir State Board of School Education
Indian Institute of Skiing and Mountaineering, Gulmarg
Central Institute of Buddhist Studies, Leh

Health in Jammu and Kashmir 

Health in Jammu and Kashmir

See also

References

External links 

 
 Government of Jammu and Kashmir, India

Jammu and Kashmir
Jammu and Kashmir